The 2004–05 Superliga season was the 17th since its establishment.

Athletic Bilbao conquered their third consecutive title.

Teams and locations

League table

Results

See also
 2005 Copa de la Reina de Fútbol

References

Season on soccerway

2004-05
Spa
1
women